Tieshan Subdistrict is a subdistrict in Huangdao District, Qingdao, Shandong, China. , it administers the following 43 villages: 
Zhangcang Village
Hanjia Village
Liumeijiazhuang Village
Bulingtou Village
Qianshigou Village
Xinxiazhuang Village
Qianxinzhuang Village
Houxinzhuang Village
Liujiada Village
Qianjilin Village
Houjilin Village
Biejia Village
Dongfanghong Village
Xiaopingling Village
Dapingling Village
Bing Village
Dongnanzhuang Village
Citang Village
Shanliujiazhuang Village
Caochengshan Village
Xujiada Village
Daxiazhuang Village
Xibeizhuang Village
Huangnixiang Village
Dunshang Village
Shanggou Village
Dongnanya Village
Mocheng'an Village
Xinxing Village
Lijiadianzi Village
Wangjiagou Village
Zhaojia Village
Jinzhukeng Village
Miaojiahe Village
Zhujiayuan Village
Dayujia Village
Songjiadianzi Village
Xiaoyujia Village
Henan Village
Xinhe Village
Zhengjiamiao Village
Changqing Village
Houshigou Village

See also 
 List of township-level divisions of Shandong

References 

Township-level divisions of Shandong
Geography of Qingdao
Subdistricts of the People's Republic of China